Darnell McDonald (born May 26, 1976) is a former wide receiver for the Los Angeles Xtreme of the XFL. McDonald played one season for the Tampa Bay Buccaneers in the NFL in 1999.  He also played for the BC Lions, Calgary Stampeders and Winnipeg Blue Bombers of the Canadian Football League. McDonald played for the New Orleans VooDoo of the Arena Football League in 2007. He holds the record for most receiving yards at the Fiesta Bowl with 206 yards in 1998 and tying Rhett Dawson for most touchdown receptions with 3.  He was credited with being a key to success in the win by Kansas State against Syracuse.

References

External links
Just Sports Stats
Darnell McDonald profile at NFL.com
Darnell McDonald - Xtreme Roster

1976 births
Living people
American football wide receivers
Kansas State Wildcats football players
Los Angeles Xtreme players
Players of American football from Virginia
Players of American football from Chicago
Players of Canadian football from Chicago
Tampa Bay Buccaneers players
New Orleans VooDoo players
BC Lions players
Calgary Stampeders players
Winnipeg Blue Bombers players
Canadian football wide receivers
African-American players of American football
African-American players of Canadian football
21st-century African-American sportspeople
20th-century African-American sportspeople